Muddy Creek is a tributary of the Colorado River, approximately  long, in north central Colorado in the United States.

It rises in northwestern Grand County, in the Routt National Forest west of Rabbit Ears Pass at the continental divide. It flows south, east, then southwest, and joins the Colorado near Kremmling.

Wolford Mountain Reservoir
The creek was dammed in 1996 to create the Wolford Mountain Reservoir, which forms part of the Wolford Mountain Recreation Area.

See also
 List of rivers of Colorado
 List of tributaries of the Colorado River

References

Rivers of Colorado
Rivers of Grand County, Colorado
Tributaries of the Colorado River in Colorado